1 Chronicles 9 is the ninth chapter of the Books of Chronicles in the Hebrew Bible or the First Book of Chronicles in the Old Testament of the Christian Bible. The book is compiled from older sources by an unknown person or group, designated by modern scholars as "the Chronicler", and had the final shape established in late fifth or fourth century BCE. This chapter contains list of Jerusalem's inhabitants in the post-exilic period (verses 1–34), and closes with the family of Saul (verses 35–44), an almost literal repetition of the list of in 1 Chronicles 8:29–38. The first part of the chapter (verses 1–34) belongs to the section focusing on the list of genealogies from Adam to the lists of the people returning from exile in Babylon (1 Chronicles 1:1 to 9:34), whereas the second part (verses 35–44)  belongs to the section focusing on the kingship of David (1 Chronicles 9:35 to 29:30).

Text
This chapter was originally written in the Hebrew language. It is divided into 44 verses.

Textual witnesses
Some early manuscripts containing the text of this chapter in Hebrew are of the Masoretic Text tradition, which includes the Aleppo Codex (10th century), and Codex Leningradensis (1008).

There is also a translation into Koine Greek known as the Septuagint, made in the last few centuries BCE. Extant ancient manuscripts of the Septuagint version include Codex Vaticanus (B; B; 4th century), Codex Sinaiticus (S; BHK: S; 4th century), Codex Alexandrinus (A; A; 5th century) and Codex Marchalianus (Q; Q; 6th century).

Old Testament references
: .

Returned exiles in Jerusalem (9:1–16)
This section contains a list of people returning from Babylonian exile to Jerusalem, in following order: Israel (non-clerics, naming four tribes: Judah, Benjamin, Ephraim, Manasseh; verses 1–9), priests (verses 10–13), and Levites (verses 14–16). Verses 2–17 were probably adapted from Nehemiah 11:3-19.

Verse 1
So all Israel were reckoned by genealogies; and, behold, they were written in the book of the kings of Israel and Judah, who were carried away to Babylon for their transgression.
"Reckoned": "recorded" or "enrolled".
"Book of the kings of Israel and Judah": also used in 2 Chronicles 27:7 and 36:8, whereas a factually identical expression, "Book of the kings of Israel", is used in 2 Chronicles 20:34 (cf. 33:18).
"Carried away to Babylon": reoccurs in 2 Chronicles 36:20.

Verse 2
And the first inhabitants who dwelt in their possessions in their cities were Israelites, priests, Levites, and the Nethinim.
 Cross reference: 
"The first": refers to the people returning the earliest from exile. Other translations are rendered 'the main, most important residents', 'the first inhabitants from old'.

Verse 3
And in Jerusalem dwelt of the children of Judah, and of the children of Benjamin, and of the children of Ephraim, and Manasseh;
"Ephraim, and Manasseh": is a unique information in the Chronicles, implying that some 'residents of the northern kingdom who were loyal to YHWH and repeatedly called upon to find asylum in Judah/Jerusalem on religious grounds' have indeed repeatedly heeded the calls.

Verse 10
And of the priests; Jedaiah, and Jehoiarib, and Jachin,
"Jedaiah": The name of the second of "24 Priestly Divisions" in 1 Chronicles 24. One fragment of Dead Sea Scrolls (4Q325; "Mishmarot D") mentions:
"The beginning of the se[cond] month is [on the si]xth [day] of the course of Jedaiah. On the second of the month is the Sabbath of the course of Harim...."
"Jehoiarib": The name of the first of "24 Priestly Divisions" in 1 Chronicles 24.
"Jachin": The name of the twenty-first of "24 Priestly Divisions" in 1 Chronicles 24.

The gatekeepers (9:17–34)
The gatekeepers (or 'porters' are described in great lengths as a part of Levite families (cf. ff; they are listed separately from other 'Levites') with specific duties (verses 18–19) to guard 'thresholds of the tent' as well as the entrances, rooted from the desert-dwelling period and not changed since that time. This is different from the singers, who only held their office when their job as bearers of the ark became unnecessary (cf. ). Other than guard duties they also in charge of utensils, furnitures, materials for service and even baking the flat cakes and "rows of breads" (cf. ).  also give a special attention to gatekeepers.

The family of King Saul (9:35–44)
This section focuses on the genealogy of Saul, the first ruler of Israel, nearly identical to the list in 1 Chronicles 8:29–38, to conclude the genealogies of the tribes of Israel.

Verse 39
And Ner begat Kish, and Kish begat Saul, and Saul begat Jonathan, and Malchishua, and Abinadab, and Eshbaal.
In , he is known as "Ishvi".

Verse 40
And the son of Jonathan was Meribbaal: and Meribbaal begat Micah.

See also

Related Bible parts: Genesis 46, Numbers 26, 2 Samuel 2, 1 Chronicles 8, 1 Chronicles 10, 1 Chronicles 26,  Nehemiah 11

Notes

References

Sources

External links
 Jewish translations:
 Divrei Hayamim I - I Chronicles - Chapter 9 (Judaica Press) translation [with Rashi's commentary] at Chabad.org
 Christian translations:
 Online Bible at GospelHall.org (ESV, KJV, Darby, American Standard Version, Bible in Basic English)
 First Book of Chronicles Chapter 9. Bible Gateway

09